Swanthamevide? Bandhamevide? is a 1984 Indian Malayalam-language family drama film directed by J. Sasikumar and written by S. L. Puram Sadanandan from a story by Sasikumar. The film is about the issues cropping up inside a family after the marriage of two sons. Mohanlal, Jose Prakash, Swapna, Lalu Alex, Menaka, and Adoor Bhasi appears in major roles. The film features music composed by Johnson. The film was received positive reviews from critics and audience alike and mixed to appreciated and criticised the family drama considered one of the best brothers  bonding .

Plot

Madhavan Nair, a lorry driver is loyal and honest to his master Keshava Panicker. In return, Panicker offers him a lorry, and a house in which to stay along with his family consisting of Lakshmi, his wife and two sons. With time, Madhavan Nair turns into a rich businessman who owns several buses, automobile workshops, and trucks. Balachandran, his elder son runs his business, while Rajendran, younger son is of carefree nature, who is also in his final years in college.

Rajendran falls in love with Usha, Panicker's daughter, while Balachandran is in love with Indu, daughter of Varma, an old feudal family, who had lost all his wealth with time. With the consent of parents, both Rajendran and Balachandran marry and their hearts throb. But life turns more troublesome after the marriage.

Both Indu and Usha get into petty quarrels leading to serious clashes inside the house. Things even get out of hand with both the brothers getting into physical fights in front of the parents. In such a fight between Rajendran and Balan, Madhavan Nair and Lakshmi interfere, but accidentally, the blow hit on Lakshmi's head, leading to her death, shocking everyone.

Cast 
 
Mohanlal as Rajendran  Nair 
Swapna as Usha Paniker
Lalu Alex as Balachandran  Nair
Menaka as Indulekha 
Jose Prakash as Madhavan Nair
Kaviyoor Ponnamma as Leshmi Nair
Jagathy Sreekumar as Gopakumar
Adoor Bhasi as Keshava Paniker
Meena as Bhagirathi
Kundara Johnny  as Sreedharan
M. S. Thripunithura as Indu's Father
Sukumari as Indu's Mother
Kollam G. K. Pillai as Sankara pillai

Soundtrack
The songs were composed by Johnson and the lyrics were by Poovachal Khader.

Box Office
The film was a commercial success.

References

External links

1980s Malayalam-language films
1984 films
Films directed by J. Sasikumar